Richard Astley, D.D. (died 23 February 1636) was warden of All Souls College, Oxford, from 1618 until his death.

Astley graduated B.A. from Lincoln College, Oxford on 3 February 1593; M.A. from All Souls College on 9 November 1596; and B.D. on 19 November 1606. He is buried in the chapel at All Souls, and his will was proved at Oxford 27 April 1636.

References

Year of birth unknown
1636 deaths
Alumni of Lincoln College, Oxford
Wardens of All Souls College, Oxford